Ornipholidotos tessmani is a butterfly in the family Lycaenidae. It is found on Bioko, an island 32 km off the west coast of Africa. The habitat consists of forests.

References

Butterflies described in 2005
Taxa named by Michel Libert
Ornipholidotos
Endemic fauna of Equatorial Guinea
Butterflies of Africa